

Wolfsohn is a German language surname, which means "son of Wolf". Alternative spellings include Wolffsohn, Wolfssohn, and Wolffssohn. The name may refer to:

Aaron Halle-Wolfssohn (1754–1835), German translator and writer
Alfred Wolfsohn (1896–1962), German singing teacher
David Wolffsohn (1856–1914), German businessman and Zionist activist
Michael Wolffsohn (born 1947), German historian

See also
Wolfson
Wolffsohn's viscacha
Wolffsohn's leaf-eared mouse

German-language surnames
Jewish surnames
Yiddish-language surnames